

The Brumby Aircraft Brumby 610 Evolution is an Australian single-engined, two-seat, training or touring, cabin monoplane of all-metal construction. The aircraft is built by Brumby Aircraft Australia as a production or kit aircraft at Cowra Airport near Cowra, New South Wales, Australia. The base cost of the aircraft is A$110,000.

Design and development
Announced in 2010, the Brumby 610 is essentially a high-wing development of the Brumby 600, featuring a slightly larger fuel capacity and heavy-duty undercarriage components. Designed primarily as a trainer to focus on landing phases, the Brumby 610 also displays benign stall characteristics, with a lower landing speed than the Brumby 600, and a stall speed of 38 knots (70 km/h). It has fixed tricycle landing gear and seating for two in side-by-side configuration, with doors on each side of the cabin. The Brumby 610 is available with two powerplants; the  Lycoming IO-233 or  Rotax 912 series engine, driving a two or three bladed propeller. Unlike the Brumby 600, the Brumby 610 is not offered with the Jabiru 3300 engine option. The prototype was first flown under RA-Aus registration in March 2011, and by 2014 eight had been delivered, either as kits or complete aircraft. A factory built Brumby 610 was the first aircraft in Australia to be fitted with the Lycoming O-233 engine.

Specifications

References

2010s Australian civil utility aircraft
Brumby Aircraft Australia aircraft